Jan Gerard Palm (born 2 June 1831, died 13 December 1906) was a 19th-century composer. Palm is often referred to as the "Father of Curaçao's classical music".

Biography
Born in Curaçao, Palm had directed several music ensembles by a relatively young age. In 1859, he was appointed music director of the citizen's guard orchestra in Curaçao. Palm played several musical instruments such as piano, organ, lute, clarinet, flute, and mandolin. As an organist, Palm played for many years in the Jewish synagogue Emanu-El and Mikvé Israel, the Protestant Fort Church, and the Lodge Igualdad in Curaçao. He was also a regular contributor to the widely read and influential periodical Notas y Letras (Notes and Letters). This periodical was issued in Curaçao between 1886 and 1888, with numerous subscribers throughout Latin America and the Caribbean.

Palm died at the age of 75 on December 13th, 1906. Musicians and composers Rudolph Palm (1880–1950), John Palm (1885–1925), Toni Palm (1885–1963), Jacobo Palm (1887–1982), Albert Palm (1903–1958), Edgar Palm (1905–1998), and Robert Rojer (1939) are his descendants.

Compositions
As a composer, Palm can be characterized as both original and productive. One of his well-known statements used to be that a good composition should include at least one surprising change. Palm wrote more than 180 compositions. His waltzes and mazurkas can be characterized by a rich use of harmonic variations. His polkas, marches and galop reveal his buoyant life style. Palm was also often progressive, in the sense of not being afraid of using chords that were relatively unusual for his time. The rhythms that he wrote for each of his danzas are typically complex, very creole and sensual. In the dominantly prudish 19th century, Jan Gerard Palm was the only composer who dared to write erotic tumbas.

Alongside dance music written for the piano, Palm also wrote larger works for the orchestra and for piano and violin. Examples of the latter are the fantasies and serenades. Finally he also wrote several pieces for services in the synagogue, the protestant church and the Lodge.

Media

References

1831 births
1906 deaths
19th-century composers
19th-century Dutch male musicians
20th-century composers
20th-century Dutch male musicians
Curaçao musicians
Dutch Antillean composers
Male composers